Oreta jaspidea is a moth in the family Drepanidae. It was described by William Warren in 1896. It is found on Buru, the Key Islands, New Guinea, the Bismarck Archipelago, the Louisiade Archipelago, Australia (Queensland) and the Solomon Islands.

The wingspan is about 30 mm. The wings range from yellow to brown, with speckles near the base, and sometimes a wavy line from the wingtip to the middle of the inner margin of the forewings.

Subspecies
Oreta jaspidea jaspidea (Buru, Key Islands, New Guinea, Bismarck Archipelago, Louisiade Archipelago, Queensland)
Oreta jaspidea rubicunda (Warren, 1902) (Solomon Islands)

References

Moths described in 1896
Drepaninae